Liam Turner (born 22 July 1999) is an Irish rugby union player, currently playing for Pro14 and European Rugby Champions Cup side Leinster. A former captain of the winning Blackrock Senior Cup Team, his preferred position is wing. Turner made his debut for Leinster in October 2020.

National team
Turner represents the Ireland national rugby sevens team on the World Rugby Sevens Series, where he plays as a forward. He debuted for the national sevens team in 2020.

References

External links
itsrugby.co.uk Profile

1999 births
Living people
Irish rugby union players
Leinster Rugby players
Rugby union wings
Rugby union centres
Ireland international rugby sevens players